Netherton Goods station or Netherton Depot was a railway public freight facility located between Neilston railway station and Patterton railway station just west of the proposed site of Lyoncross railway station, East Renfrewshire, Scotland. Netherton Goods served the industrial and agricultural requirements for transportation in the vicinity, with the town of Arthurlie not far away, sitting on and near to country lanes to Neilston, Arthurlie and Barrhead. Netherton, Glanderston, Balgraystone and Dyke Farms were located nearby. Netherton Goods was close to Lyoncross Junction between the Lanarkshire and Ayrshire Railway and the Paisley and Barrhead District Railway near Balgray Reservoir.

Although a seemingly remote location today the facility would have had freight transport business in the form of lime for the fields, cattle, horse and sheep movements, milk and cheese delivery, mining and quarrying related items, etc.

Infrastructure 

The OS maps of 1911 shows a fairly basic infrastructure with the double track main line and a single siding running off to branch twice, one siding running to a loading dock and a single siding running to a shorter second loading and unloading area. The access point was from Springhill Road, just across from the road overbridge. A signal box was not present and only a possible ground frame and a lone signal post at the siding are shown. A weighing machine is shown and the demolition rubble of this brick structure were still visible in 2016. In 1958 the tracks were still in situ.

History 
Opened by the Lanarkshire and Ayrshire Railway 1903, then joining the Caledonian Railway it became part of the London Midland and Scottish Railway during the Grouping of 1923.

Netherton Goods station lay on the line that ran towards Neilston and Uplawmoor and then onwards to eventually reach a terminus at Ardrossan Montgomerie Pier railway station. It was supervised by staff at Neilston railway station.

Other purely goods stations down the line were located at Gree (opened 1 May 1903  and closed by 1950)  and at Lissens close to Kilwinning.

Workings details
In 1907 the Caledonian Railway Working Timetable (WTT) shows that the 12.10pm goods from Gushetfaulds to Ardrossan via Cathcart worked nearby Gree siding and it would probably have worked Netherton en route.

The site today
Railway workers accommodation cottages were never built at the site probably as the facility was too small. Although the sidings have been lifted the site is still in use for access and for the storage of materials. The electrified double track line of the Neilston branch still runs past the site. Two telecoms system masts and associated GSM-R equipment are located on the old loading dock and provide railway staff with voice and text communication.

References

Notes

Sources 
 
 
 Wham, Alasdair (2013). Ayrshire's Forgotten Railways. A Walker's Guide. Cranborne : Oakwood Press. .
 RAILSCOT on Lanarkshire and Ayrshire Railway
 Good's station site on navigable O.S. map

External links
Video footage of the Netherton Goods station site

History of East Renfrewshire
Demolished buildings and structures in Scotland